Alessandro Covi (born 28 September 1998) is an Italian cyclist, who currently rides for UCI WorldTeam .

Major results

2015
 6th Trofeo Citta di Loano
 8th Overall Tour du Pays de Vaud
2016
 1st Montichiari–Roncone
 1st Grand Prix Bati-Metallo
 1st Stage 1 Tour du Pays de Vaud
 2nd Overall Grand Prix Rüebliland
 4th Ronde van Vlaanderen Juniores
2018
 1st Stage 6 Tour de l'Avenir
 8th Overall Giro Ciclistico d'Italia
2019
 4th Overall Giro Ciclistico d'Italia
2020
 2nd Giro dell'Appennino
 8th Coppa Sabatini
 9th Brabantse Pijl
2021
 2nd Coppa Bernocchi
 3rd Overall Giro di Sicilia
1st  Young rider classification
 3rd Coppa Ugo Agostoni
 5th Clásica de San Sebastián
 5th Giro del Veneto
 7th Circuito de Getxo
 9th Tre Valli Varesine
2022
 1st Vuelta a Murcia
 Vuelta a Andalucía
1st  Points classification
1st Stage 2
 1st Stage 20 Giro d'Italia
 3rd Trofeo Laigueglia
 9th Gran Piemonte
 9th Grand Prix La Marseillaise
2023
 3rd Trofeo Laigueglia

Grand Tour general classification results timeline

References

External links

1998 births
Living people
Competitors at the 2018 Mediterranean Games
Cyclists from Piedmont
Italian Giro d'Italia stage winners
Italian male cyclists
Mediterranean Games competitors for Italy
Sportspeople from the Province of Novara
People from Borgomanero